Heterophyllium is a genus of mosses belonging to the family Sematophyllaceae.

The genus has almost cosmopolitan distribution.

Species:
 Heterophyllium acunae Thériot, 1941 
 Heterophyllium adscendens (Lindb.) Broth.

References

Hypnales
Moss genera